The 2010–11 Yeovil Town F.C. season was Yeovil Town's 8th season in the Football League and their sixth consecutive season in League One finishing in their second highest ever position of 14th with 59 points.

Key events 
 13 May:The club announces Aidan Downes, Andre McCollin, Scott Murray and Richard Martin will be released; Danny Hutchins has been transfer listed. Asked to re-sign are: Dean Bowditch, Terrell Forbes, Jean-Paul Kalala, Keiran Murtagh, Nathan Smith and Gavin Tomlin.
 20 May:Luke Ayling it is confirmed has signed a two-year contract next season linking up with the squad on 1 July after having been released by Arsenal.
 21 May:Andy Williams agrees a deal to sign for the club on a two-year deal after rejecting terms at Bristol Rovers.
 26 May:Terrell Forbes rejects contract offer and instead links up with ex-boss Russell Slade at Leyton Orient.
 16 June:The club announces that Bowditch, Smith and Tomlin have verbally agreed to re-sign; Kalala and Murtagh will link up for pre-season training.
 22 June:Dean Bowditch officially signs to the team.
 23 June:Nathan Smith has officially re-signed.
 30 June:Gavin Tomlin despite verbally agreeing a deal with the club rejects terms and signs for League One newcomers Dagenham & Redbridge on a three-year deal. Keiran Murtagh also leaves the club for Wycombe Wanderers after failing to agree a deal with Yeovil.
 1 July:Luke Freeman signs on a six-month loan deal from Arsenal.
 2 July:Ed Upson signs for the clubs on a two-year deal after being released from Ipswich Town.
 16 July:Jean-Paul Kalala signs a new one-year contract and the club agree a deal to sign Paul Huntington on a two-year deal.
 24 July:Darren Way's benefit match against Manchester United XI leads to a 3–2 win for Yeovil.
 27 July:Millwall goalkeeper John Sullivan signs a one-month loan deal.
 28 July:Watford defender/midfielder Rob Kiernan signs on a one-month loan deal.
 29 July:Former Southend United striker Craig Calver signs a one-year deal with the club.
 30 July:Former Brighton & Hove Albion defender Adam Virgo signs a one-year contract and Manchester United Winger Cameron Stewart signs on 6-month loan deal.
 10 August:Former Yeovil striker Adam Stansfield dies of colorectal cancer at the age of just 31.
 20 August:Yeovil sign former Watford trainee Billy Gibson on a six-month contract.
 27 August:Welsh midfielders Owain Tudur Jones and Shaun MacDonald sign on loan from Norwich City and Swansea City respectively.
 9 September:Gavin Williams also resigns on loan from Bristol City after a contribution to his wages made by three local businessmen.
 17 September:After goalkeeper John Sullivan suffers an injury, Bristol City shot-stopper Stephen Henderson signs on a short-term loan.
 23 September:Record appearance holder Len Harris passes away at the age of 73, he had a 14-year spell with The Glovers from 1958 to 1973, making 691 appearances in total.
 1 October:Rob Kiernan returns to Watford early after failing to make an impact in his loan spell.
 12 October:Shaun MacDonald makes his international debut for Wales.
 15 October:Former managers Malcolm Allison, 83, and Colin Lippiatt, 68, pass away.
 19 October:Manchester United winger Cameron Stewart also returns after a lack of first team appearances.
 1 November:After suffering concussion in the Swindon Town match goalkeeper Stephen Henderson returns to Bristol City one game early.
 13 November:The contract of Danny Hutchins is terminated by 'mutual consent' with immediate effect.
 15 November:Chelsea reserve team striker Adam Phillip signs on a month loan.
 22 November:Northern Irish international Ivan Sproule signs on a month loan deal until 19 December from Bristol City.
 23 November:Luke Freeman returns early to Arsenal after suffering a persistent back injury.
 25 November:Former England youth international defender Tom Parkes signs on loan from Leicester City until 3 January 2011.
 27 November:Yeovil's F.A. Cup second-round game at Hartlepool United is postponed due to a frozen pitch.
 4 December:The home game against Peterborough United is postponed due to a frozen pitch.
 7 December:The F.A. Cup second round is postponed for the second time again due to a frozen pitch.
 18 December:The Carlisle United home game is also postponed due to heavy snow in the local area.
 24 December:Both the Boxing day home game against Brentford and the away trip to Sheffield Wednesday are postponed for a frozen pitch and burst under-soil heating pipes respectively.
 28 December:Player goalkeeper coach Ben Roberts leaves the club for a post at Charlton Athletic.
 31 December:Yeovil appoint Jon Sheffield as a replacement goalkeeper coach for the departing Roberts, and also reveal a triple signing Max Ehmer and Paul Wotton on one-month loans from QPR and Southampton respectively and also re-signing goalkeeper Richard Martin on a 'short term' contract.
 4 January:Yeovil complete the double signing of loan goalkeeper Stephen Henderson, and Bath City midfielder Alex Russell.

Playing staff

First team 
 Statistics include only League, FA Cup and League Cup appearances and goals, as of the end of the season.
 Age given is at the start of Yeovil's first match of the season (7 August 2010).

Youth team scholars

Transfers

In

Out

Loan in

Loan out

Match results 
League positions are sourced from Statto, while the remaining contents of each table are sourced from the references in the "Ref" column.

League One

League table

FA Cup

League Cup

Football League Trophy

Statistics

Player details 
Numbers in parentheses denote appearances as substitute.

Awards

End-of-season awards 

Green & White Supporters Club Player of the Season
 Winner: Stephen Henderson
 Runner-up: Paul Huntington

Western Gazette Player of the Season
 Winner: Stephen Henderson

Cary Glovers Player of the Season
 Winner: Stephen Henderson

Away Travel Club Player of the Season
 Winner: Stephen Henderson
 Runner-up: Paul Huntington

Bobby Hamilton Young Player Award
 Winner: Luke Ayling

Andy Stone Memorial Trophy for Top Goalscorer
 Winner: Dean Bowditch

Disabled Supporters Association Player of the Season
 Winner: Andy Welsh

Disabled Supporters Association Young Player of the Season
 Winner: Luke Ayling

See also 
 2010–11 in English football
 List of Yeovil Town F.C. seasons

References 

2010–11 Football League One by team
2010-11